The Abitibiwinni First Nation is an Algonquian First Nation in the Canadian province of Quebec, residing primarily in the community of Pikogan in the Abitibi-Témiscamingue region.

The First Nation had a total population of 916 in Indian and Northern Affairs Canada's 2009 Indian Registry, of whom 597 lived in Pikogan and 319 lived off-reserve. Hip hop musician Samian is one of the most noted members of the nation.

References

External links
  Conseil de la Première Nation Abitibiwinni

First Nations governments in Quebec
Algonquin